Emodomelanelia is a lichen genus in the family Parmeliaceae. It is monotypic, containing the single foliose Himalayan species Emodomelanelia masonii.

Taxonomy
Emodomelanelia masonii was first described in 1991 as Parmelia masonii by lichenologists Theodore Esslinger and Josef Poelt. It was named in honour of Mason Hale, the "preeminent student of the Parmeliaceae". The genus was circumscribed in 2010 by Pradeep Kumar Divakar and Ana Crespo. Emodomelanelia is in the "Melanohalea" clade (one of nine major groups in the Parmelioid clade of the Parmeliaceae) along with the genera Melanelixia and Melanohalea. The genus name combines emodo (referring to the Himalayas) and melanelia (referring to the brown colour of the upper thallus surface).

Description
Characteristics of the genus Emodomelanelia include an olive brown to brown thallus, narrow to moderately broad lobes, a non-pored epicortex, the presence of effigurate pseudocyphellae (i.e. with a lobed shape), and bifusiform conidia. The cortex stains green with HNO3+.

Habitat and distribution
Emodomelanelia masonii is endemic to the Himalayas, where it grows on rocks in alpine and subalpine habitats. It has been recorded from mainland China, India, Nepal and Taiwan.

References

Monotypic Lecanorales genera
Lichen genera
Parmeliaceae
Taxa described in 2010
Taxa named by Josef Poelt